The snow leopard (Panthera uncia), also known as the ounce, is a felid in the genus Panthera native to the mountain ranges of Central and South Asia. It is listed as Vulnerable on the IUCN Red List because the global population is estimated to number fewer than 10,000 mature individuals and is expected to decline about 10% by 2040. It is threatened by poaching and habitat destruction following infrastructural developments. In the northern part of its range, it also lives at lower elevations.

Taxonomically, the snow leopard was long classified in the monotypic genus Uncia. Since phylogenetic studies revealed the relationships among Panthera species, it has been considered a member of that genus. Two subspecies were described based on morphological differences, but genetic differences between the two have not been confirmed. It is therefore regarded as a monotypic species.

Naming and etymology 

Both the Latin name uncia and the English word ounce are derived from the Old French once, which was also used for the Eurasian lynx (Lynx lynx). Once is thought to have evolved from an earlier variant of lynx by false splitting; lonce was interpreted as l'once, in which l is the elided form of the French definite article la ('the'), leaving once to be perceived as the animal's name.
The word panther derives from the classical Latin panthēra, itself from the ancient Greek πάνθηρ pánthēr, which was used for spotted cats.

Taxonomy and evolution 

Felis uncia was the scientific name used by Johann Christian Daniel von Schreber in 1777 who described a snow leopard based on an earlier description by Georges-Louis Leclerc, Comte de Buffon, assuming that the cat occurred along the Barbary Coast, in Persia, East India and China. The genus name Uncia was proposed by John Edward Gray in 1854 for Asian cats with a long and thick tail.
Felis irbis proposed by Christian Gottfried Ehrenberg in 1830 was a skin of a female snow leopard collected in the Altai Mountains. He also clarified that several leopard (P. pardus) skins were previously misidentified as snow leopard skins.
Felis uncioides proposed by Thomas Horsfield in 1855 was a snow leopard skin from Nepal in the collection of the Museum of the East India Company.

Uncia uncia was used by Reginald Innes Pocock in 1930 when he reviewed skins and skulls of Panthera species from Asia. He also described morphological differences between snow leopard and leopard skins.
Panthera baikalensis-romanii proposed by a Russian scientist in 2000 was a dark brown snow leopard skin from the Petrovsk-Zabaykalsky District in southern Transbaikal.

The snow leopard was long classified in the monotypic genus Uncia.
It was subordinated to the genus Panthera based on results of phylogenetic studies.

Until spring 2017, there was no evidence available for the recognition of subspecies. Results of a phylogeographic analysis indicate that three subspecies should be recognised: 
P. u. uncia in the range countries of the Pamir Mountains
P. u. irbis in Mongolia, and 
P. u. uncioides in the Himalayas and Qinghai.
This view has been both contested and supported by different researchers.

Additionally, an extinct subspecies Panthera uncia pyrenaica was described in 2022 based on material found in France.

Evolution 

Based on phylogenetic analysis of DNA sequence sampled across the living Felidae, the snow leopard forms a sister group with the tiger (P. tigris). Panthera originates most likely in northern Central Asia. Panthera blytheae excavated in western Tibet's Ngari Prefecture is the oldest known Panthera species and exhibits skull characteristics similar to the snow leopard.

The mitochondrial genomes of the snow leopard, the leopard and the lion (P. leo) are more similar to each other than their nuclear genomes, indicating that their ancestors hybridised at some point in their evolution.

Characteristics 

The snow leopard's fur is whitish to grey with black spots on head and neck, with larger rosettes on the back, flanks and bushy tail. The belly is whitish. Its eyes are pale green or grey in color. Its muzzle is short and its forehead domed. Its nasal cavities are large.
In relation to the length of its skull and width of its palate, it has large nasal openings, which allow for increasing the volume of air inhaled with each breath, and at the same time for warming and humidifying cold dry air. It is not especially adapted to high-altitude hypoxia.

The snow leopard shows several adaptations for living in a cold, mountainous environment. Its small rounded ears help to minimize heat loss. Its broad paws well distribute the body weight for walking on snow, and have fur on their undersides to increase the grip on steep and unstable surfaces; it also helps to minimize heat loss. Its long and flexible tail helps to maintain balance in the rocky terrain. The tail is very thick due to fat storage, and is covered in a thick layer of fur, which allows the cat to use it like a blanket to protect its face when asleep.

The snow leopard differs from the other Panthera species by a shorter muzzle, an elevated forehead, a vertical chin and a less developed posterior process of the lower jaw. It cannot roar despite its partly ossified hyoid bone, as its  short vocal folds provide little resistance to airflow.

Distribution and habitat 
The snow leopard is distributed from the west of Lake Baikal through southern Siberia, in the Kunlun Mountains, Altai Mountains, Sayan and Tannu-Ola Mountains, in the Tian Shan, through Tajikistan, Kyrgyzstan, Uzbekistan and Kazakhstan to the Hindu Kush in eastern Afghanistan, Karakoram in northern Pakistan, in the Pamir Mountains, the Tibetan Plateau and in the high elevations of the Himalayas in India, Nepal and Bhutan. In Mongolia, it inhabits the Mongolian and Gobi Altai Mountains and the Khangai Mountains. In Tibet, it occurs up to the Altyn-Tagh in the north.
In the beginning of the 1990s, the Indian snow leopard population was estimated at 200–600 individuals living across about 25 protected areas.

Snow leopards were recorded by camera traps at 16 locations in northeastern Afghanistan's isolated Wakhan Corridor.

Behavior and ecology

The snow leopard's vocalizations include meowing, grunting, prusten and moaning. It can purr when exhaling.

It is solitary and active mostly at dawn until early morning, and again in afternoons and early evenings. It mostly rests near cliffs and ridges that provide vantage points and shade. In Nepal's Shey Phoksundo National Park, the home ranges of five adult radio-collared snow leopards overlapped largely, though they rarely met.

Their home ranges overlapped less than 20%. These results indicate that about 40% of the 170 protected areas in snow leopard range countries are smaller than the home range of a single male snow leopard.

Snow leopards leave scent marks to indicate their territories and common travel routes. They scrape the ground with the hind feet before depositing urine or feces, but also spray urine onto rocks. Their urine contains many characteristic low molecular weight compounds with diverse functional groups including pentanol, hexanol, heptanol, 3-octanone, nonanal and indole, which possibly play a role in chemical communication.

Hunting and diet

While squatting on its haunches, it ripped out clumps of hair from the abdomen and then opened it to first feed on the viscera.
The snow leopard is a carnivore and actively hunts its prey. Its preferred wild prey species are Himalayan blue sheep (Pseudois nayaur), Himalayan tahr (Hemitragus jemlahicus), argali (Ovis ammon), markhor (Capra falconeri) and wild goat (C. aegagrus). It also preys on domestic livestock. Its diet depends on prey availability and varies across its range and season. In the Himalayas, it preys mostly on Himalayan blue sheep, Siberian ibex (C. sibirica), white-bellied musk deer (Moschus leucogaster) and wild boar (Sus scrofa). In the Karakoram, Tian Shan, Altai and Mongolia's Tost Mountains, its main prey consists of Siberian ibex, Thorold's deer (Cervus albirostris), Siberian roe deer (Capreolus pygargus) and argali. Snow leopard feces collected in northern Pakistan also contained remains of rhesus macaque (Macaca mulatta), masked palm civet (Paguma larvata), Cape hare (Lepus capensis), house mouse (Mus musculus), Kashmir field mouse (Apodemus rusiges), grey dwarf hamster (Cricetulus migratorius) and Turkestan rat (Rattus pyctoris). In 2017, a snow leopard was photographed carrying a freshly killed woolly flying squirrel (Eupetaurus cinereus) near Gangotri National Park. In Mongolia, domestic sheep comprises less than 20% of snow leopard diet, although wild prey has been reduced and interactions with people are common.

They drag the prey to a safe location and consume all edible parts of the carcass. They can survive on a single Himalayan blue sheep for two weeks before hunting again, and one adult individual apparently needs 20–30 adult blue sheep per year. Snow leopards have been recorded to hunt successfully in pairs, especially mating pairs.

The snow leopard is capable of killing most animals in its range, with the probable exception of the adult male yak. It also eats a significant amount of vegetation, including grass and twigs. It has not been reported to attack humans, is easily driven away from livestock and readily abandons kills, often without defending itself.

Reproduction and life cycle

Snow leopards become sexually mature at two to three years, and normally live for 15–18 years in the wild. In captivity they can live for up to 25 years. Oestrus typically lasts from five to eight days, and males tend not to seek out another partner after mating, probably because the short mating season does not allow sufficient time. Paired snow leopards mate in the usual felid posture, from 12 to 36 times a day. They are unusual among large cats in that they have a well-defined birth peak. They usually mate in late winter, marked by a noticeable increase in marking and calling. Females have a gestation period of 90–100 days, and the cubs are born between April and June. 
A litter usually consists of two to three cubs, in exceptional cases there can be up to seven.

The female gives birth in a rocky den or crevice lined with fur shed from her underside. Their eyes open at around seven days, and the cubs can walk at five weeks and are fully weaned by 10 weeks. The cubs leave the den when they are around two to four months of age. Three radio-collared snow leopards in Mongolia's Tost Mountains gave birth between late April and late June. Two female cubs started to part from their mothers at the age of 20 to 21 months, but reunited with them several times for a few days over a period of 4–7 months. One male cub separated from its mother at the age of about 22 months, but stayed in her vicinity for a month and moved out of his natal range at 23 months of age.

The snow leopard has a generation length of eight years.

Threats 
The major threat to snow leopard populations is poaching and illegal trade of skins and body parts. Between 1999 and 2002, three live snow leopard cubs and 16 skins were confiscated, 330 traps were destroyed and 110 poachers were arrested in Kyrgyzstan. Undercover operations in the country revealed an illegal trade network with links to Russia and China via Kazakhstan. The major skin trade center in the region is the city of Kashgar in Xinjiang. In Tibet and Mongolia, skins are used for traditional dresses, and meat in traditional Tibetan medicine to cure kidney problems; bones are used in traditional Chinese and Mongolian medicine for treating rheumatism, injuries and pain of human bones and tendons. Between 1996 and 2002, 37 skins were found in wildlife markets and tourist shops in Mongolia. Between 2003 and 2016, 710 skins were traded, of which 288 skins were confiscated. In China, 103 to 236 animals are poached every year, in Mongolia between 34 and 53, in Pakistan between 23 and 53, in India from 21 to 45, and in Tajikistan 20 to 25. In 2016, a survey of Chinese websites revealed 15 advertisements for 44 snow leopard products; the dealers offered skins, canine teeth, claws and a tongue. Nine snow leopard skins were found during a market survey in September 2014 in Afghanistan.

Greenhouse gas emissions will likely cause a shift of the treeline in the Himalayas and a shrinking of the alpine zone, which may reduce snow leopard habitat by 30%.

Where snow leopards prey on domestic livestock, they are subject to conflict with humans. 
The loss of natural prey due to overgrazing by livestock, poaching, and defense of livestock are the major drivers for the decreasing population of the snow leopard. Livestock also cause habitat degradation, which, alongside the increasing use of forests for fuel, reduces snow leopard habitat.

Conservation 

The snow leopard is listed in CITES Appendix I. It has been listed as threatened with extinction in Schedule I of the Convention on the Conservation of Migratory Species of Wild Animals since 1985.
Hunting snow leopards has been prohibited in Kyrgyzstan since the 1950s. In India, the snow leopard is granted the highest level of protection under the Wildlife Protection Act, 1972, and hunting is sentenced with imprisonment of 3–7 years. In Nepal, it has been legally protected since 1973, with penalties of 5–15 years in prison and a fine for poaching and trading it.
Since 1978, it has been listed in the Soviet Union’s Red Book and is still inscribed today in the Red Data Book of the Russian Federation as threatened with extinction. Hunting snow leopards is only permitted for the purposes of conservation and monitoring, and to eliminate a threat to the life of humans and livestock. Smuggling of snow leopard body parts is punished with imprisonment and a fine.
Hunting snow leopards has been prohibited in Afghanistan since 1986.
In China, it has been protected by law since 1989; hunting and trading snow leopards or their body parts constitute a criminal offence that is punishable by the confiscation of property, a fine and a sentence of at least 10 years in prison.
It has been protected in Bhutan since 1995.

At the end of 2020, 35 cameras were installed on the outskirts of Almaty, Kazakhstan in hopes to catch footage of snow leopards. In November 2021, it was announced by the Russian World Wildlife Fund (WWF) that snow leopards were spotted 65 times on these cameras in the Trans-Ili Alatau mountains since the cameras were installed.

Snow leopards inhabit the following protected areas:
 in Kazakhstan: Aksu-Zhabagly Nature Reserve
 in Russia: Katun Nature Reserve, Sayano-Shushenski Nature Reserve
 in Kyrgyzstan: Sarychat-Ertash State Nature Reserve, Sary-Chelek Nature Reserve, Besh-Tash State Nature National Park, Kyrgyz-Ata National Park, Karakol National Park, Chychkan Wildlife Refuge;
 in Uzbekistan: Chatkalskiy State Nature Reserve, Zaamin National Park, Ugam-Chatkal National Park, Hissar National Reserve;
 in Tajikistan: Pamir National Park
 in Mongolia: Altai Tavan Bogd National Park, Tsambagarav Uul National Park, Har Us Nuur National Park and Gobi Gurvansaikhan National Park
 in China: Chang Tang Nature Reserve, Qomolangma National Nature Preserve and Sanjiangyuan National Nature Reserve on the Tibetan Plateau, Tomur National Conservation Zone in the western Tianshan Mountains, Qilianshan National Nature Reserve in the Qilian Mountains,
 in India: Hemis National Park, Kishtwar National Park, Dachigam National Park, Gulmarg Wildlife Sanctuary, Hirpora Wildlife Sanctuary, Rangdum Wildlife Reserve, Overa-Aru, Kanji, Gya-Miru and Baltal-Thajwas Wildlife Sanctuaries in Ladakh, Jammu and Kashmir; Pin Valley National Park, Great Himalayan National Park, Rupi-Bhaba Wildlife Sanctuary, Sechu Tuan Nala Wildlife Sanctuary and Kibber Wildlife Sanctuary in Himachal Pradesh; Nanda Devi National Park, Gangotri National Park and Valley of Flowers National Park in Uttarakhand; Khangchendzonga National Park and Dibang Wildlife Sanctuary in the Eastern Himalayas;
 in Nepal: Api Nampa Conservation Area, Dhorpatan Hunting Reserve, Shey Phoksundo National Park, Annapurna Conservation Area, Manaslu Conservation Area, Langtang National Park, Sagarmatha National Park, Makalu Barun National Park and Kanchenjunga Conservation Area;
 in Bhutan: Bumdeling Wildlife Sanctuary, Jigme Dorji National Park and Wangchuck Centennial National Park.

Global Snow Leopard Forum 
In 2013, government leaders and officials from all 12 countries encompassing the snow leopard's range (Afghanistan, Bhutan, China, India, Kazakhstan, Kyrgyzstan, Mongolia, Nepal, Pakistan, Russia, Tajikistan, and Uzbekistan) came together at the Global Snow Leopard Forum (GSLF) initiated by the then-President of Kyrgyzstan Almazbek Atambayev, and the State Agency on Environmental Protection and Forestry under the government of Kyrgyzstan. The meeting was held in Bishkek, and all countries agreed that the snow leopard and the high mountain habitat need trans-boundary support to ensure a viable future for snow leopard populations, and to safeguard its fragile environment. The event brought together many partners, including NGOs like the Snow Leopard Conservancy, the Snow Leopard Trust, and the Nature and Biodiversity Conservation Union. Also supporting the initiative were the Snow Leopard Network, the World Bank's Global Tiger Initiative, the United Nations Development Programme, the World Wild Fund for Nature, the United States Agency for International Development, and Global Environment Facility.

At the GSLF meeting, the 12 range countries signed the Bishkek Declaration, which stated: "[We] acknowledge that the snow leopard is an irreplaceable symbol of our nations' natural and cultural heritage and an indicator of the health and sustainability of mountain ecosystems; and we recognize that mountain ecosystems inhabited by snow leopards provide essential ecosystem services, including storing and releasing water from the origins of river systems benefitting one-third of the world’s human population; sustaining the pastoral and agricultural livelihoods of local communities which depend on biodiversity for food, fuel, fodder, and medicine; and offering inspiration, recreation, and economic opportunities."

In captivity 

The Moscow Zoo exhibited the first captive snow leopard in 1872 that had been caught in Turkestan. In Kyrgyzstan, 420 live snow leopards were caught between 1936 and 1988 and exported to zoos around the world. The first captive bred snow leopard cubs were born in the 1990s in the Beijing Zoo.
The Snow Leopard Species Survival Plan was initiated in 1984; by 1986, American zoos held 234 individuals.

Cultural significance

The snow leopard is widely used in heraldry and as an emblem in Central Asia. It has long been used as a political symbol, the Aq Bars ('White Leopard'), by Tatars, Kazakhs, and Bulgars. A snow leopard is depicted on the official seal of Almaty and on the former 10,000 Kazakhstani tenge banknote. A mythical winged Aq Bars is depicted on the national coat of arms of Tatarstan, the seal of the city of Samarqand, Uzbekistan and the old coat of arms of Nur-Sultan. In Kyrgyzstan, it has been used in highly stylized form in the modern emblem of the capital Bishkek, and the same art has been integrated into the badge of the Kyrgyzstan Girl Scouts Association. A crowned snow leopard features in the arms of Shushensky District in Russia. It is the state animal of Ladakh and Himachal Pradesh in India.

See also
 List of largest cats

References

Further reading

External links 

Apex predators
Big cats
Mammals of East Asia
Fauna of the Himalayas
Fauna of Siberia
Felids of Asia
Felids of India
IUCN Red List vulnerable species
Snow leopard
Mammals of Central Asia
Mammals of South Asia
National symbols of Pakistan
Snow leopard
Symbols of Himachal Pradesh
Vulnerable animals
Vulnerable biota of Asia
National symbols of Afghanistan